House at 19 Locust Place is a historic home located at Sea Cliff in Nassau County, New York.  It was built in 1893 and is a large, rambling -story house with slate-covered cross-gable roof and a large round tower in the Shingle Style.  It features a broad shed-roofed wraparound porch supported by Doric order columns and a variety of window types.

It was listed on the National Register of Historic Places in 1988.

References

Houses on the National Register of Historic Places in New York (state)
Shingle Style houses
Houses completed in 1893
Houses in Nassau County, New York
National Register of Historic Places in Nassau County, New York
Shingle Style architecture in New York (state)